Robert Foucrault is the coroner for San Mateo County, California. He joined the coroner's office in 1992 and was promoted to Chief Deputy Coroner in 1998. As deputy coroner, he assumed the duties when coroner Adrian "Bud" Moorman died on April 10, 2001, and was appointed to the coroner's office on June 4, 2002.

References

External links
County of San Mateo: Coroner's Office website

Year of birth missing (living people)
Living people
People from San Mateo County, California
American coroners